Suarez is a Belgian rock pop band with Marc Pinilla on lead vocals and the musician brothers Max et Pata Njava and their cousin Dada Ravalison. The band was established in 2008 in Mons, Belgium where the band had its own studio. In 2008, they showcased in a number of festivals including Les Francofolies de Spa where they performed in the new talents section of the festival with great reception prompting them to release two albums On attend, their debut in 2008 and L'indécideur in 2010. For their second album, Suarez received "Best new talent" award during Octaves de la musique, the music awards of the French Belgian market as well as "Album of the Year" for the same album. Their 2010 hit "Qu'est-ce que j'aime ça" remains their most known hit.

2011 saw the joining of David Donnat as a fifth member to the band. The band's third album En équilibre in 2014 has been a commercial success and made it to the top of the Ultratop Belgian (Wallonia) Albums Chart.

Suarez' style of music includes elements of rock, pop, acoustic music, French, English, Latin and Malagasy (Madagascar) music from where most of the members come from. The band was named after Portuguese explorer Diego Suarez who explored Madagascar where the Bay of Diego Suarez is named after him. The band has a following in Belgium, the Netherlands, France and Canada.

Members
Marc Pinilla - vocals and guitar
Max Randriamanjava - bass and guitar, backing vocals
Pata Randriamanjava - drums, backing vocals
Dada Ravalison - guitar, bass, backing vocals
David Donnat - percussions (since 2011)

In popular culture
Suzarez' lead vocalist Marc Pinilla served as a coach during the second, third and sixth season, and a guest mentor on the anniversary season of The Voice Belgique, the Belgian version of the music competition show.

Discography

Albums

Singles

References

External links
Official website

Belgian rock music groups
Belgian pop music groups
Musical groups established in 2008